The criminal law of Australia is the body of law in Australia that relates to crime.

Responsibility for criminal law in Australia is divided between the state and territory parliaments and the Commonwealth Parliament. This division is due to the Commonwealth Parliament's limited legislative powers under Australian constitutional law.

The criminal law system differs across Australian States; with distinctions readily found across jurisdictions regarding criminal offences, sentencing, and criminal procedure.

Additionally, there exists a distinction between Australia's 'Code States' and 'Common Law States'. The 'Code States' of Western Australia, Queensland, and Tasmania have wholly replaced the system of judge-made criminal law inherited from England; with legislative instruments that exhaustively define the criminal law within those states. Other Australian States have retained the criminal law as inherited through the common law; albeit modulated through legislation and subsequent common law development by Australia's courts.

Common law versus code jurisdictions
The Australian legal system inherits from that of the United Kingdom, due to Australia's colonisation by the British Empire. For this reason, much of Australia's criminal law was originally received from English common law.

In some Australian states, the common law criminal system is still in force; albeit modulated by legislation and subsequent development by Australian courts. In others, the criminal law has been wholly codified. These two types of criminal law systems are generally referred to as 'code jurisdictions' or 'common law jurisdictions' respectively. The common law jurisdictions of Australia are New South Wales, South Australia and Victoria; the code jurisdictions are the Australian Capital Territory, the Northern Territory, Queensland, Tasmania, and Western Australia.

In common law jurisdictions legislation does not always exhaustively define the elements of an offence. For example section 117 of the Crimes Act 1900 (NSW) states that larceny is an indictable offence punishable for five years; but does not define the meaning of larceny. The offence of larceny remains defined in NSW by the common law.

Jurisdictions

Commonwealth

The Commonwealth's jurisdiction in criminal matters is more limited than Australia's states. This is due to Australia's constitutional arrangements in which the Commonwealth has been granted only a limited and exhaustive list of subjects upon which it can validly enact legislation. Some analogies may be drawn with the constitutional arrangements of the United States.

Commonwealth offences are mostly found within either the Crimes Act 1914, or within the Criminal Code Act 1995. The 1995 act was enacted after a review of Commonwealth criminal law undertaken by Sir Harry Gibbs in 1987, which recommended that Commonwealth criminal law be consolidated. That committee also drafted a model criminal code for adoption within all Australian jurisdictions; however, that code was only adopted in part by the ACT and Northern Territory legislatures.

The Commonwealth has occasionally used its powers to override state criminal laws. For instance, the  overrode sodomy laws in Tasmania.

The Criminal Code Act 1995 has been amended many times, including for purposes of national security and counter-terrorism.

New South Wales
The primary criminal statutes of NSW is the Crimes Act 1900 (NSW). Other statutes, such as the Summary Offences Act 1988, also create criminal offences which are generally dealt with in the Local Court system.

Offences spelt out in the Drug Misuse and Trafficking Act 1985 (NSW) cover all prohibited drugs.

Among other important legislation is the Bail Act 2013, Uniform Evidence Act 1995 and the Customs Act 1901.

Prosecution of criminal offences is subject to the Law Enforcement (Powers and Responsibilities) Act 2002, which sets out the limits of police powers.

Special circumstances regarding child offenders is provided for under the Young Offender Act 1997 (NSW).

Victoria
The primary criminal statute in Victoria is the Crimes Act 1958. Criminal procedure is consolidated within the Criminal Procedure Act 2009 (Vic).

Other important legislation includes the Evidence Act 2008 (Vic), Summary Offences Act 1966 (Vic) and Jury Directions Act 2015 (Vic).

South Australia
Most crimes in South Australia are codified in the Criminal Law Consolidation Act 1935 (SA).

There are also a number of common law provisions for criminal conduct in South Australia.

Queensland 
The Criminal Code Act 1899 (Qld), is the primary instrument for the source of criminal law in Queensland.

The act is sometimes referred to as the 'Griffith Code', named for Sir Samuel Griffith, who was responsible for its production. In drafting the code, Griffith borrowed heavily from Italy's Zanardelli Code, which Griffith described as 'the most complete and perfect Penal Code in existence'. Griffith also took inspiration from the New York Penal Code. The Griffith Code was later adopted by other jurisdictions, including Western Australia, Nigeria and Papua New Guinea.

The book Carter's Criminal Law of Queensland is a collection of annotated information on case law associated with the Queensland criminal code; it is popular among legal scholars and practitioners.

Western Australia
The Criminal Code (WA) is a complete codification of Western Australia's criminal law. The code is substantially similar to Queensland's criminal code, and was constructed with close reference to the Griffith code.

Section 4 in appendix B of the Criminal Code Act Compilation Act 1913 (WA) provides that:"No person shall be liable to be tried or punished in Western Australia as for an offence, except under the express provisions of the Code, or some other statute law of Western Australia, or under the express provisions of some statute of the Commonwealth of Australia..."The effect of this provision is that no person can be tried for offences that are not explicitly provided for in legislation, abolishing offences at common law. Notably, the common law offence of contempt of court has been preserved by s 7 of the Act in the same Appendix B, allowing courts of criminal jurisdiction to summarily try someone for this single common law offence. The Criminal Code Compilation Act 1913 (WA) itself is the compiling Act of the Parliament of Western Australia but does not contain any criminal offences. The criminal offences are provided for in Schedule of the Act, and citing criminal offences in the Schedule is simply to the Criminal Code (WA). There are many other Acts in WA which have contain criminal offences, including (but not limited to) the Misuse of Drugs Act 1981 (WA), the Firearms Act 1973 (WA), the Road Traffic Act 1974 (WA), the Local Government Act 1995 (WA), and the Bushfires Act 1954 (WA).

Tasmania
Tasmania's serious criminal offences are set out in the Criminal Code Act 1924 (Tas).

There are numerous other laws where provisions outlining offences may be found. E.g. the Firearms Act, the Police Offences Act, or Road Safety (Alcohol and Drugs) Act.

Northern Territory
The primary criminal statute of the Northern Territory is the Criminal Code Act 1983 (NT). The Northern Territory has also exhaustively codified its criminal laws in a manner similar to Queensland and Western Australia.

The NT Criminal Code Act 1983, was drafted with cose reference to both the Queensland and WA Criminal Codes.

Australian Capital Territory
Offences and defences are mostly codified by the Crimes Act 1900, and the Criminal Code Act 2002.

Model criminal code
It has been proposed that Australian jurisdictions should make criminal laws consistent through adoption of a model criminal code. At present, New South Wales, Western Australia and the Northern Territory have participated in modifying some crimes to match the position in the model criminal code, but in many areas states have not changed laws to reflect this code, and in some instances rejected the code entirely.

Notes

References

External links

The Commonwealth Criminal Code – A Guide for Practitioners
Commonwealth Criminal Code

Australian criminal law
Australia